John Wood Old Mill, also known as Wood's Mill and John Wood Mill, is a historic sawmill and grist mill located at Merrillville, Lake County, Indiana. It was built in 1837–1838, and is a -story, rectangular brick building.  It has a gambrel roof with overhanging eaves.  The mill operated into the 1930s. The mill was restored by the Lake County Parks and Recreation Department in 1976.

It was listed in the National Register of Historic Places in 1975.

References

Grinding mills in Indiana
Grinding mills on the National Register of Historic Places in Indiana
Industrial buildings completed in 1838
Buildings and structures in Lake County, Indiana
National Register of Historic Places in Lake County, Indiana